This is a list of undomesticated or feral plants, generally considered weeds, yet having some positive effects or uses, often being ideal as companion plants in gardens.

Beneficial weeds can accomplish a number of roles in the garden or yard, including fertilizing the soil, increasing moisture, acting as shelter or living mulch, repelling pests, attracting beneficial insects, or serving as food or other resources for human beings.

Chart

Categories of beneficial weeds

Pest-repellent
 Neem—repels leaf eating insects

Edible
 Blackberry—blackberries are rich in nutrients, and their thorny stems can form a barrier against some larger pest mammals.
 Burdock—roots are edible (as are the stalks, but particularly the young leaves.)
 Chickweed (Stellaria media)—used in salads and also as ground cover.
 Cornflower—various colors; can be served as edible garnish to decorate salads.
 Flatweed—leaves are edible raw, while roots are edible after being roasted.
 Horsetail—primeval plant that is high in silica; tops are very similar to & may be eaten like asparagus.
 Lamb's quarters—leaves and shoots, raw, also prevents erosion, also distracts leaf miners from nearby crops.
 Nettle—young leaves collected before flowering used as a tea or spinach substitute. Plants have use as compost material or for fibre.
 Purslane—prepared raw for salads or sautéed.
 Shepherd's purse—leaves are edible and often sautéed or blanched.
 Watercress—can be eaten raw or cooked; is considered a weed in some cultures (caution required when harvesting wild because of the risk of contracting potentially fatal liver fluke).

Habitat for beneficial insects
 Wild blackberry—attracts predatory insects, and produces berries.
 Motherwort—attracts bees.
 Joe-Pye weed—habitat for pollinators and predatory insects.
 Aster—habitat for predatory insects.

Shelter plants
 Normal grass can be used as ground cover, especially in nitrogenous soils.

Trap crops
Trap crops draw potential pests away from the actual crop intended for cultivation.

 Cowpea—attracts ladybird beetle, so planting around cotton fields protects them from sucking insects. It serves as source of food and niche.

See also 
 List of companion plants
 List of edible flowers
 List of pest-repelling plants

Organic approaches 
 Organic farming
 Organic gardening

Indexes 
 :Category:Sustainable agriculture

References

Bibliography 
 Peterson, L.A. & Peterson, R.T. (1999).  A Field Guide to Edible Wild Plants: Eastern and central North America. Houghton-Mifflin.
 Duke, J.A., Foster, S., & Peterson, R.T. (1999). A Field Guide to Medicinal Plants and Herbs of Eastern and Central North America. Houghton-Mifflin.
 Gibbon, E. (1988). Stalking the Wild Asparagus. Alan C. Hood & Company.
 Sharma, O.P., R.C. Lavekar, K.S. Murthy and S.N. Puri (2000). Habitat diversity and predatory insects in cotton IPM: A case study of Maharashtra cotton eco-system. Radcliffe's IPM world textbook. Minnesota University, USA.

Beneficial

Beneficial weeds
beneficial weeds